Preston Morrand Carrington  (born June 12, 1949) is an American former long jumper who competed in the 1972 Summer Olympics.  He ran collegiately for Wichita State University.

He set his personal best in the qualifying round of the Olympics, which would have won a silver medal if it were in the final.

References

1949 births
Living people
American male long jumpers
Olympic track and field athletes of the United States
Athletes (track and field) at the 1972 Summer Olympics
Wichita State Shockers men's track and field athletes